The 1990 International cricket season was from May 1990 to September 1990.

Season overview

April

1990 Austral-Asia Cup

May

New Zealand in England

July

India in England

References

1990 in cricket